Blenniella caudolineata, the blue-spotted blenny, is a species of combtooth blenny found in coral reefs in the Pacific ocean.

References

caudolineata
Fish described in 1877
Taxa named by Albert Günther